The Government of the 25th Dáil or the 20th Government of Ireland (10 March 1987 – 12 July 1989) was the government of Ireland formed after the 1987 general election on 17 February 1987. It was a minority Fianna Fáil government which had the qualified support of Fine Gael, the main opposition party, an arrangement known as the Tallaght Strategy after a speech by its leader Alan Dukes. The national debt had doubled under the previous government. The government introduced budget cuts in all departments. The taxation system was also reformed. One of the major schemes put forward was the establishment of the International Financial Services Centre (IFSC) in Dublin. During this period the Government organised the 1,000-year anniversary of the founding of Dublin.

The 20th Government lasted  days from its appointment until the resignation of Haughey on 29 June 1989, and continued to carry out its duties for a further 13 days until the appointment of the successor government, giving a total of  days.

20th Government of Ireland

Nomination of Taoiseach
The 25th Dáil first met on 10 March 1987. In the debate on the nomination of Taoiseach, leader of Fine Gael and outgoing Taoiseach Garret FitzGerald, leader of Fianna Fáil Charles Haughey, and leader of the Progressive Democrats Desmond O'Malley were each proposed. FitzGerald was defeated with 51 votes in favour to 114 against, while there was an equal number of votes of 82 cast in favour and against Haughey. The proposal was carried on the casting vote of the Ceann Comhairle. Haughey was appointed as Taoiseach by president Patrick Hillery.

Members of the Government
After his appointment as Taoiseach by the president, Haughey proposed the members of the government and they were approved by the Dáil. They were appointed by the president on the same day.

Changes to Departments

Attorney General
On 10 March 1987 John L. Murray SC was appointed by the president as Attorney General on the nomination of the Taoiseach.

Ministers of State
On 10 March 1987, the Government appointed Vincent Brady, Michael Smith, Joe Walsh, Séamus Brennan, Seán McCarthy and Séamus Kirk as Ministers of State on the nomination of the Taoiseach. On 12 March 1987, the Government appointed the other Ministers of State on the nomination of the Taoiseach.

Government policy

Economy

The 20th government passed three budgets through the 1987, 1988 and 1989 Finance Acts The Finance minister Ray MacSharry committed himself to bringing order to the public finances and the poor economic situation. His cutting of state spending earned him the nickname Mack the Knife.

During this time he came to be identified as Haughey's heir apparent as Taoiseach and Fianna Fáil leader. MacSharry, however wanted to leave politics by the time he was forty-five. He was fifty and had achieved some of the highest offices in the Irish government. In 1988 MacSharry was appointed European Commissioner, ending his domestic political career.

The Minister for Industry and Commerce Albert Reynolds blocked the hostile takeover of Irish Distillers by Grand Metropolitan. The company was eventually sold to Pernod Ricard for $440 million.

Health
During this period major industrial action was taken by junior doctors. 1,800 doctors went on strike to protest their lack of job security and the governments cuts to the health budget.

During this period a large number of haemophiliacs contracted HIV and Hepatitis C from contaminated blood products supplied by the Blood Transfusion Service Board.

Justice
In 1988 the Irish Prison officers association went on strike. The government had to use 1,000 Gardaí and 300 soldiers to guard the prisons.

Northern Ireland

During this period the government faced serious difficulties dealing with Northern Ireland and the IRA. After the signing of the Anglo-Irish Agreement Relations improved between the Republic and Britain. However, there were tensions between the governments over the imprisonment of the Birmingham Six and the apparent shoot-to-kill policy in Northern Ireland policy of the security forces in Northern Ireland. Formal protest was made by the government following the Loughgall ambush where eight IRA members and a civilian were killed by a SAS unit.

Relations improved with the extradition of Paul Kane. His appeal to the justice minister for freedom was rejected. Kane escaped from the Maze Prison in 1983 after being convicted of firearm offences.

During this period the IRA managed to smuggle a gun into the Four Courts in an attempted prison escape.

Constitutional amendment
On 26 May 1987 the Tenth Amendment of the Constitution of Ireland was approved by referendum. This permitted the state to ratify the Single European Act.

Dissolution and resignation
On 25 May 1989, the president dissolved the Dáil on the advice of Haughey. The general election was held on 15 June, the same date as the European Parliament election.

The 26th Dáil first met on 26 June 1989. The Dáil did not successfully nominate anyone for the position of Taoiseach on that day, with Charles Haughey, Alan Dukes and Dick Spring being defeated. This was the first time that this occurred on the first sitting of the Dáil after a general election. Haughey resigned as Taoiseach on 29 June but under the provisions of Article 28.11 of the Constitution, the members of the government continued to carry out their duties until their successors were appointed. The 21st Government of Ireland was formed on 12 July 1989 as a coalition between Fianna Fáil and the Progressive Democrats, with Charles Haughey again serving as Taoiseach.

See also
Dáil Éireann
Constitution of Ireland
Politics of the Republic of Ireland

References

1987 establishments in Ireland
1989 disestablishments in Ireland
25th Dáil
Cabinets established in 1987
Cabinets disestablished in 1989
Governments of Ireland
Minority governments